Donald Curphey (born 3 February 1948) is a Canadian rower. He competed in the men's coxless four event at the 1972 Summer Olympics.

References

1948 births
Living people
Canadian male rowers
Olympic rowers of Canada
Rowers at the 1972 Summer Olympics
Rowers from Toronto